The Onehunga Line in Auckland, New Zealand is the name given to suburban train services that operate between Newmarket and Onehunga (formerly between Britomart and Onehunga via Newmarket).

Routing 
From Newmarket, Onehunga Line services follow the North Auckland Line (NAL) to Penrose, where they diverge from the NAL and follow the Onehunga Branch line to Onehunga.

History 
The line did not acquire its name until 2010, when the Onehunga Branch line was reopened and passenger services resumed from the Auckland terminus after a lapse of almost 40 years.

The Penrose to Onehunga section of this line was opened on 24 December 1873, and extended to Onehunga Wharf on 28 November 1878. Connecting the port of Onehunga on the Manukau Harbour with Penrose and from there to the port of Auckland on the Waitematā Harbour, the line became a busy link between the two harbours of the rapidly expanding city.

Passenger services between Auckland and Onehunga ran until April 1973. The Onehunga Branch line between Penrose and Onehunga then served local industries until it was mothballed. A campaign to reopen the branch line was launched in mid-2002. On 13 March 2007, the Government announced that it had given approval to spend $10 million on reopening the branch line for passengers and freight.

In mid-2010, construction started on the terminus station at Onehunga, and on Saturday 18 September 2010, reopening ceremonies were held, with Sunday 19 September being the first day of normal passenger services. The cost of reopening the branch line was about $21.6 million, with KiwiRail contributing $10 million, Auckland Regional Transport Authority contributing $3.6 million, and Auckland Regional Council contributing $8 million.

The Onehunga Line was upgraded as part of the Auckland railway electrification programme. It was the first of the four Auckland suburban lines to be commissioned. Installation of overhead wires was completed during the summer shut down from 2011 to 2012. Electric services began running between Britomart and Onehunga on 28 April 2014.

On 24 June 2022, the line was shortened to terminate at Newmarket due to a reduction of platforms at Britomart for City Rail Link construction. Auckland Transport said data showed only 15% of passengers on the line travelled to Britomart and that they could easily transfer to other services at Newmarket, thus the change would be the least disruptive of those needed to allow the reduction in platforms. Former Auckland councillor Mike Lee - who had an instrumental role in the 2010 reopening of the line - criticised the change.

Stations

Proposed airport connection 
There is a proposal to create the Auckland Airport Line by extending the Onehunga Branch line to Auckland International Airport over the Mangere Bridge. The bridge was duplicated from four motorway lanes to ten in 2007–10, and Transit New Zealand had announced in 2007 that it was being 'future proofed' to allow it to accommodate a rail line.

See also 
 Public transport in Auckland
 List of Auckland railway stations

References 

Railway lines in New Zealand
Public transport in Auckland
Rail transport in Auckland